John Dalton Alderson (3 February 1929 – 6 November 2022) was a New Zealand first-class cricketer. He played for Canterbury in the 1949–50 and 1950–51 seasons.

Alderson attended Christchurch Boys' High School, where he broke the school's javelin record in 1947. He then trained as a teacher at Canterbury College in Christchurch.

An opening bowler, Alderson took 5 for 66 in the first innings of his first-class debut against Wellington in 1949–50. He was less successful later, and lost his place in the team after two seasons.

After his cricket career, Alderson ran the family brickyard in Christchurch before moving to Auckland in 1965 and taking up dairying. He died at his farm at Karaka on 6 November 2022, at the age of 93. He and his wife Gloria, who predeceased him, had two sons.

References

External links
 
 

1929 births
2022 deaths
Canterbury cricketers
Cricketers from Auckland
People educated at Christchurch Boys' High School
University of Canterbury alumni